Bater may refer to:

People
 Bater (surname)
 Bagatur (born 1955), Chinese politician

Places
 Bater (Novi Vinodolski), a settlement near Novi Vinodolski, Croatia
 Bater, Lebanon, a municipality of Lebanon